NE Patras (NEP), Nautical Union of Patras (Ναυταθλητική Ένωση Πατρών), is a water polo and swimming  club situated in Patras, Greece.

History 

NEP was founded in 2006 in Patras, Western Greece with the unification of two nautical clubs of the city: Thriamvos Patras (founded in 1976) and Poseidon Patras (founded in 1982).

The club is today participating in the Second Division/A2 Ethniki of the Greek Championship of men. Womens participating in the first division of greek championship of women.

. NEP has participated in the First Division (A1 Ethniki) and the A1 Ethniki Women's, reaching in both department the League's fourth place. In 2010, NEP Women's team reached the Women's LEN Trophy final four, ending up in the 3rd place.

Honours

Women
A1 Ethniki Women participation: 2006, 2007, 2008, 2009, 2010, 2011, 2012, 2013
Women's LEN Trophy participation: 2007, 2008, 2010
Men
A1 Ethniki participation: 2008, 2009, 2010, 2011
LEN Euro Cup participation: 2010

Gallery

References

Water polo clubs in Greece
Sport in Patras